The British Basketball Federation, known as British Basketball, is the national sports governing body for basketball in Great Britain. It organises Great Britain teams for men and women in international competition. Northern Irish players normally compete for Ireland, but are also eligible to compete for the GB.

The three home nations associations - Basketball England, basketballscotland and Basketball Wales - still have responsibility for basketball in their own countries, including organising competitions and developing the sport.

History
The British & Irish Basketball Federation (BIBF) was formed in 1960 from funding from the Sports Council. Northern Ireland began to be represented by Basketball Ireland, and in 2004 Ireland left the BIBF.

In October 2004 the BIBF changed its name to Great Britain Basketball.

In December 2006 the British Basketball Federation (BBF) was formed, and GB teams replaced England in the U20 and senior age groups in FIBA competitions. In order for GB teams to compete in the London Olympics in 2012, FIBA had insisted that a single governing body for Great Britain be formed, rather than the existing three separate home nations. England, Scotland and Wales continued to compete separately in youth competitions.

Basketball Wales rejected a full merger in 2012, so the new governing body was initially formed by just England Basketball (now Basketball England) and basketballscotland. Wales eventually agreed to join the new federation in 2015. The merger was formally completed in October 2016, and the home nations gave up their individual memberships of FIBA. Great Britain national teams now compete in all age groups from U16 to senior, with Scotland and Wales still able to field separate teams in some lower division youth competitions.

The federation is based in the offices of UK Sport.

See also
 Basketball England
 basketballscotland
 Basketball Wales
 British Basketball League

References

External links
 British Basketball
 UK Sport

2006 establishments in the United Kingdom
Basketball
  
Organisations based in the London Borough of Camden
Basketball
Sports organizations established in 2006